In group theory, especially, in geometric group theory, the class of free-by-cyclic groups have been deeply studied as important examples. A group  is said to be free-by-cyclic if it has a free normal subgroup  such that the quotient group  is cyclic. In other words,  is free-by-cyclic if it can be expressed as a group extension of a free group by a cyclic group (NB there are two conventions for 'by'). Usually, we assume  is finitely generated and the quotient is an infinite cyclic group.

An isomorphism class of a free-by-cyclic group is determined by an outer automorphism.

Examples
The class of free-by-cyclic groups contains various groups as follow:
 A free-by-cyclic group is hyperbolic if and only if the attaching map is atoroidal.
 Some free-by-cyclic groups are hyperbolic relative to free-abelian subgroups.
 Notably, there is a non-CAT(0) free-by-cyclic group.

References
 A. Martino and E. Ventura (2004), The Conjugacy Problem for Free-by-Cyclic Groups . Preprint from the Centre de Recerca Matemàtica, Barcelona, Catalonia, Spain.

Infinite group theory
Properties of groups